Steve Freeman is an American men's college ice hockey coach. He has been the men's ice hockey head coach at Wisconsin–River Falls since 1996.

Early life and education
Freeman was born in New Brighton, Minnesota. In his youth, he played on the hockey team at Irondale High School and for the Minneapolis Junior Bruins. He earned a bachelor's degree from the University of Wisconsin–Stevens Point and a master's degree in education and professional development from University of Wisconsin–River Falls.

Career 
After graduating from college, Freeman became the head coach at Stevens Point Area Senior High School (SPASH) and led the team to four conference championships. The performance brought Freeman recognition for his talent and he was brought in as the head coach/GM of the Dubuque Fighting Saints. After two rather poor years with the team, Freeman left and became an assistant at University of Wisconsin–Stevens PointUniversity of Wisconsin–River Falls under Dean Talafous. While there, he earned a master's in education and helped the Falcons win the 1994 NCAA Championship, defeating previously unbeaten Fredonia State in the semifinals.

After Talafous left in 1996, Freeman was promoted to head coach and had remained in that position since (as of 2021). Freeman's teams were often the second best in the NCHA but, because of the small number of at-large bids available, that wasn't always enough to earn the Falcons an appearance in the NCAA Tournament. River Falls made the Frozen four in 2001 but the team had spent most of the time in the shadow of the conference's dominant power, St. Norbert.

In 2013, all five active WIAC teams left to form a new conference when the WIAC began sponsoring ice hockey as a sport. While this did provide more opportunity for Freeman's team, it also came at a price. Because the new conference didn't possess the minimum number of teams required to receive an automatic tournament berth (7), WIAC teams could only qualify for the national tournament based upon their record. Because of this, even when the Falcons won the conference championship in 2015 the were left sitting on the sidelines because the NCAA tournament didn't have to invite River Falls. Instead, Wisconsin–Stevens Point, who had won the regular season title and finished as the conference runners-up, were selected to participate.

In 2021, with many Division III teams not playing due to the COVID-19 pandemic, Freeman led the Falcons to a conference title in an abbreviated season. Before the team could play their first playoff game, virus protocols forced the team to withdraw from the tournament.

Freeman was inducted into the Wisconsin Sports Hall of Fame in 2016.

Head coaching record

See also
List of college men's ice hockey coaches with 400 wins

References

Year of birth missing (living people)
Living people
Ice hockey people from Minnesota
People from New Brighton, Minnesota
American ice hockey coaches
University of Wisconsin–Stevens Point alumni
Wisconsin–River Falls Falcons men's ice hockey coaches
University of Wisconsin–River Falls alumni